The 2019–20 Brooklyn Nets season was the 44th season of the franchise in the National Basketball Association (NBA), 53rd season overall, and its eighth season playing in the New York City borough of Brooklyn. Six players from the 2018–19 team, including D'Angelo Russell, became free agents.

Before the season, on September 18, 2019, Joseph Tsai acquired the full ownership of the Nets from Mikhail Prokhorov. On March 7, 2020, Kenny Atkinson resigned as the Nets' head coach and was replaced by Jacque Vaughn on an interim basis.

The season was suspended by league officials following the games of March 11 after it was reported that Rudy Gobert tested positive for COVID-19. On March 17, the Nets announced that four of its players tested positive for COVID-19, including Kevin Durant. On April 1, general manager Sean Marks announced that all four players recovered and were cleared by local health officials. On June 4, the regular season was declared over with the remaining games being cancelled when the NBA Board of Governors approved a plan that would restart the season with 22 teams returning to play on July 31, which was approved by the National Basketball Players Association the next day.

The Nets made the playoffs for a second consecutive season and faced the Toronto Raptors in the First Round, where they were swept in four games.

Draft

The Nets entered the draft holding two first round picks and one second round pick. On June 6, the Nets agreed to trade their 17th pick of the draft, a future first round pick and Allen Crabbe to the Atlanta Hawks in exchange for Taurean Prince and a 2021 second round pick, though the trade was not be finalized until July 6. The team used their 17th overall pick to draft Nickeil Alexander-Walker, who was sent to the Atlanta Hawks in the Allen Crabbe trade. With the 27th pick, the Nets selected Mfiondu Kabengele, who was traded to the Los Angeles Clippers in exchange to draft rights of Jaylen Hands, and used the 31st pick to draft Nic Claxton.

Roster

Standings

Division

Conference

Game log

Preseason
The preseason schedule was announced on July 10, 2019. On September 10, the Nets announced a venue change from Nassau Coliseum to Barclays Center for the October 18 game against the Toronto Raptors.

|- style="background:#bfb;"
| 1
| October 4
| Sesi/Franca
| 
| Prince (22)
| Dinwiddie (12)
| LeVert (9)
| Barclays Center10,110
| 1–0
|- style="background:#bfb;"
| 2
| October 10
| @ L.A. Lakers
| 
| Dinwiddie (20)
| Kurucs (8)
| Dinwiddie (7)
| Mercedes-Benz Arena15,992
| 2–0
|- style="background:#bfb;"
| 3
| October 12
| L.A. Lakers
| 
| LeVert (22)
| Jordan (11)
| LeVert (5)
| Universiade Sports Center17,396
| 3–0
|- style="background:#fbb;"
| 4
| October 18
| Toronto
| 
| Irving (19)
| Jordan (9)
| Dinwiddie, Irving (4)
| Barclays Center12,380
| 3–1

Regular season
The regular season schedule was released on August 12, 2019. In June 2020, the Nets released a revised eight-game schedule for the regular season.

|- style="background:#fbb;"
| 1
| October 23
| Minnesota
| 
| Irving (50)
| Prince (11)
| Irving (7)
| Barclays Center17,732
| 0–1
|- style="background:#bfb;"
| 2
| October 25
| New York
| 
| Irving (26)
| Allen, Jordan (11)
| Dinwiddie, Irving (5)
| Barclays Center17,732
| 1–1
|- style="background:#fbb;"
| 3
| October 27
| @ Memphis
| 
| Irving (37)
| Allen (13)
| Dinwiddie (8)
| FedExForum15,517
| 1–2
|- style="background:#fbb;"
| 4
| October 30
| Indiana
| 
| Irving (28)
| Jordan (17)
| Dinwiddie (7)
| Barclays Center17,083
| 1–3

|- style="background:#bfb;"
| 5
| November 1
| Houston
| 
| Prince (27)
| Prince (12)
| Irving (10)
| Barclays Center17,732
| 2–3
|- style="background:#fbb;"
| 6
| November 2
| @ Detroit
| 
| Irving, Prince (20)
| Irving (11)
| Irving (10)
| Little Caesars Arena17,222
| 2–4
|- style="background:#bfb;"
| 7
| November 4
| New Orleans
| 
| Irving (39)
| Prince (11)
| Irving (9)
| Barclays Center17,194
| 3–4
|- style="background:#bfb;"
| 8
| November 8
| @ Portland
| 
| Dinwiddie (34)
| Allen, LeVert (9)
| Irving (6)
| Moda Center20,089
| 4–4
|- style="background:#fbb;"
| 9
| November 10
| @ Phoenix
| 
| Dinwiddie (18)
| Jordan (12)
| Dinwiddie (6)
| Talking Stick Resort Arena17,290
| 4–5
|- style="background:#fbb;"
| 10
| November 12
| @ Utah
| 
| Irving (27)
| Jordan (17)
| Irving (5)
| Vivint Smart Home Arena18,306
| 4–6
|- style="background:#fbb;"
| 11
| November 14
| @ Denver
| 
| Allen, Dinwiddie, Irving (17)
| Jordan (11)
| Irving (9)
| Pepsi Center18,394
| 4–7
|- style="background:#bfb;"
| 12
| November 16
| @ Chicago
| 
| Dinwiddie (24)
| Allen, Jordan, Musa (7)
| Harris (8)
| United Center19,148
| 5–7
|- style="background:#fbb;"
| 13
| November 18
| Indiana
| 
| Dinwiddie (28)
| Allen (12)
| Dinwiddie (8)
| Barclays Center14,140
| 5–8
|- style="background:#bfb;"
| 14
| November 20
| Charlotte
| 
| Allen (22)
| Allen (17)
| Dinwiddie (8)
| Barclays Center14,011
| 6–8
|- style="background:#bfb;"
| 15
| November 22
| Sacramento
| 
| Dinwiddie (23)
| Jordan (10)
| Dinwiddie (7)
| Barclays Center15,619
| 7–8
|- style="background:#bfb;"
| 16
| November 24
| @ New York
| 
| Dinwiddie (30)
| Prince (11)
| Prince (5)
| Madison Square Garden18,770
| 8–8
|- style="background:#bfb;"
| 17
| November 25
| @ Cleveland
| 
| Dinwiddie (23)
| Allen (21)
| Dinwiddie (9)
| Rocket Mortgage FieldHouse17,143
| 9–8
|- style="background:#fbb;"
| 18
| November 27
| @ Boston
| 
| Temple (22)
| Allen (14)
| Dinwiddie (11)
| TD Garden19,156
| 9–9
|- style="background:#bfb;"
| 19
| November 29
| Boston
| 
| Dinwiddie (32)
| Allen, Jordan (11)
| Dinwiddie (11)
| Barclays Center17,732
| 10–9

|- style="background:#fbb;"
| 20
| December 1
| Miami
| 
| Dinwiddie (29)
| Allen (12)
| Prince, Temple (5)
| Barclays Center17,026
| 10–10
|- style="background:#bfb;"
| 21
| December 4
| @ Atlanta
| 
| Temple (27)
| Allen (13)
| Dinwiddie (5)
| State Farm Arena15,694
| 11–10
|- style="background:#bfb;"
| 22
| December 6
| @ Charlotte
| 
| Harris (22)
| Jordan (13)
| Dinwiddie (12)
| Spectrum Center15,075
| 12–10
|- style="background:#bfb;"
| 23
| December 8
| Denver
| 
| Dinwiddie (24)
| Allen, Prince (11)
| Dinwiddie (8)
| Barclays Center16,679
| 13–10
|- style="background:#fbb;"
| 24
| December 11
| Charlotte
| 
| Dinwiddie (24)
| Jordan (14)
| Dinwiddie (6)
| Barclays Center15,631
| 13–11
|- style="background:#fbb;"
| 25
| December 14
| @ Toronto
| 
| Dinwiddie (24)
| Jordan (13)
| Dinwiddie (8)
| Scotiabank Arena19,800
| 13–12
|- style="background:#bfb;"
| 26
| December 15
| Philadelphia
| 
| Dinwiddie (24)
| Jordan (11)
| Dinwiddie (6)
| Barclays Center17,732
| 14–12
|- style="background:#bfb;"
| 27
| December 17
| @ New Orleans
| 
| Dinwiddie (31)
| Allen (14)
| Dinwiddie (7)
| Smoothie King Center15,177
| 15–12
|- style="background:#fbb;"
| 28
| December 19
| @ San Antonio
| 
| Dinwiddie (41)
| Allen (13)
| Allen (6)
| AT&T Center18,354
| 15–13
|- style="background:#bfb;"
| 29
| December 21
| Atlanta
| 
| Dinwiddie (39)
| Jordan (20)
| Dinwiddie, Jordan (6)
| Barclays Center16,496
| 16–13
|- style="background:#fbb;"
| 30
| December 26
| New York
| 
| Dinwiddie (25)
| Temple (9)
| Dinwiddie, Pinson (3)
| Barclays Center17,732
| 16–14
|- style="background:#fbb;"
| 31
| December 28
| @ Houston
| 
| Dinwiddie (17)
| Jordan (12)
| Dinwiddie (11)
| Toyota Center18,306
| 16–15
|- style="background:#fbb;"
| 32
| December 30
| @ Minnesota
| 
| Dinwiddie (36)
| Prince (14)
| Dinwiddie (8)
| Target Center15,824
| 16–16

|- style="background:#fbb;"
| 33
| January 2
| @ Dallas
| 
| Dinwiddie (19)
| Jordan (10)
| Dinwiddie, Harris (5)
| American Airlines Center20,289
| 16–17
|- style="background:#fbb;"
| 34
| January 4
| Toronto
| 
| Dinwiddie (23)
| Jordan (8)
| Dinwiddie (7)
| Barclays Center17,732
| 16–18
|- style="background:#fbb;"
| 35
| January 6
| @ Orlando
| 
| Dinwiddie, Harris (16)
| Chandler (9)
| Temple (4)
| Amway Center15,008
| 16–19
|- style="background:#fbb;"
| 36
| January 7
| Oklahoma City
| 
| Prince (21)
| Jordan (10)
| Dinwiddie (6)
| Barclays Center15,677
| 16–20
|- style="background:#bfb;"
| 37
| January 10
| Miami
| 
| Dinwiddie (26)
| Allen (11)
| Dinwiddie (14)
| Barclays Center16,011
| 17–20
|- style="background:#bfb;"
| 38
| January 12
| Atlanta
| 
| Irving (21)
| Allen (12)
| Dinwiddie (8)
| Barclays Center15,201
| 18–20
|- style="background:#fbb;"
| 39
| January 14
| Utah
| 
| Irving (32)
| Jordan (14)
| Irving (11)
| Barclays Center15,381
| 18–21
|- style="background:#fbb;"
| 40
| January 15
| @ Philadelphia
| 
| Dinwiddie (26)
| Allen (10)
| Dinwiddie (8)
| Wells Fargo Center20,416
| 18–22
|- style="background:#fbb;"
| 41
| January 18
| Milwaukee
| 
| Irving (17)
| Allen (10)
| Irving (6)
| Barclays Center17,732
| 18–23
|- style="background:#fbb;"
| 42
| January 20
| Philadelphia
| 
| Dinwiddie (22)
| Allen (13)
| Dinwiddie (7)
| Barclays Center16,801
| 18–24
|- style="background:#fbb;"
| 43
| January 23
| L.A. Lakers
| 
| Irving (20)
| Allen (8)
| Dinwiddie (13)
| Barclays Center17,732
| 18–25
|- style="background:#bfb;"
| 44
| January 25
| @ Detroit
| 
| Irving (45)
| Allen (15)
| Irving (7)
| Little Caesars Arena15,890
| 19–25
|- style="background:#fbb;"
| 45
| January 26
| @ New York
| 
| Dinwiddie (23)
| Allen, Claxton (5)
| Dinwiddie (5)
| Madison Square Garden17,831
| 19–26
|- style="background:#bfb;"
| 46
| January 29
| Detroit
| 
| Dinwiddie (28)
| Jordan (8)
| Dinwiddie (6)
| Barclays Center14,275
| 20–26
|- style="background:#bfb;"
| 47
| January 31
| Chicago
| 
| Irving (54)
| Jordan, Prince (8)
| Dinwiddie (7)
| Barclays Center17,732
| 21–26

|- style="background:#fbb;"
| 48
| February 1
| @ Washington
| 
| Dinwiddie (26)
| Allen (15)
| Dinwiddie (6)
| Capital One Arena18,196
| 21–27
|- style="background:#bfb;"
| 49
| February 3
| Phoenix
| 
| LeVert (29)
| Jordan (9)
| LeVert (7)
| Barclays Center14,891
| 22–27
|- style="background:#bfb;"
| 50
| February 5
| Golden State
| 
| LeVert (23)
| Allen (13)
| LeVert (8)
| Barclays Center14,352
| 23–27
|- style="background:#fbb;"
| 51
| February 8
| @ Toronto
| 
| LeVert (37)
| Jordan (14)
| Dinwiddie (11)
| Scotiabank Arena19,800
| 23–28
|- style="background:#bfb;"
| 52
| February 10
| @ Indiana
| 
| Dinwiddie (21)
| Jordan (19)
| Dinwiddie (11)
| Bankers Life Fieldhouse16,761
| 24–28
|- style="background:#bfb;"
| 53
| February 12
| Toronto
| 
| LeVert (20)
| Allen (13)
| Dinwiddie (9)
| Barclays Center15,823
| 25–28
|- style="background:#fbb;"
| 54
| February 20
| @ Philadelphia
| 
| LeVert (25)
| Jordan (15)
| Dinwiddie (8)
| Wells Fargo Center20,806
| 25–29
|- style="background:#bfb;"
| 55
| February 22
| @ Charlotte
| 
| Luwawu-Cabarrot (21)
| Allen, Temple (11)
| Dinwiddie (9)
| Spectrum Center19,079
| 26–29
|- style="background:#fbb;"
| 56
| February 24
| Orlando
| 
| Dinwiddie (24)
| Allen (11)
| Dinwiddie, LeVert (8)
| Barclays Center16,162
| 26–30
|- style="background:#fbb;"
| 57
| February 26
| @ Washington
| 
| LeVert (34)
| Jordan (16)
| LeVert (7)
| Capital One Arena15,021
| 26–31
|- style="background:#fbb;"
| 58
| February 28
| @ Atlanta
| 
| Dinwiddie (24)
| Allen (9)
| Dinwiddie (13)
| State Farm Arena17,034
| 26–32
|- style="background:#fbb;"
| 59
| February 29
| @ Miami
| 
| Dinwiddie (25)
| Allen (11)
| Dinwiddie (12)
| American Airlines Arena19,600
| 26–33

|- style="background:#bfb;"
| 60
| March 3
| @ Boston
| 
| LeVert (51)
| Jordan (15)
| LeVert (5)
| TD Garden19,156
| 27–33
|- style="background:#fbb;"
| 61
| March 4
| Memphis
| 
| Prince (15)
| Allen (9)
| LeVert (6)
| Barclays Center16,941
| 27–34
|- style="background:#bfb;"
| 62
| March 6
| San Antonio
| 
| LeVert (27)
| LeVert (11)
| LeVert (10)
| Barclays Center16,277
| 28–34
|- style="background:#bfb;"
| 63
| March 8
| Chicago
| 
| Dinwiddie (24)
| Jordan (15)
| Dinwiddie (6)
| Barclays Center15,916
| 29–34
|- style="background:#bfb;"
| 64
| March 10
| @ L.A. Lakers
| 
| Dinwiddie (23)
| Jordan (12)
| Dinwiddie (7)
| Staples Center18,997
| 30–34

|- style="background:#fbb;"
| 65
| July 31
| Orlando
| 
| Luwawu-Cabarrot (24)
| Kurucs (6)
| LeVert (7)
| HP Field HouseNo in-person attendance
| 30–35
|- style="background:#bfb;"
| 66
| August 2
| Washington
| 
| LeVert (34)
| Allen (15)
| Chiozza (6)
| HP Field HouseNo in-person attendance
| 31–35
|- style="background:#bfb;"
| 67
| August 4
| @ Milwaukee
| 
| Luwawu-Cabarrot (26)
| Hall (9)
| Chiozza (10)
| Visa Athletic CenterNo in-person attendance
| 32–35 
|- style="background:#fbb;"
| 68
| August 5
| @ Boston
| 
| Martin (20) 
| Allen (8)
| Allen, Martin (4)
| The ArenaNo in-person attendance
| 32–36
|- style="background:#bfb;"
| 69
| August 7
| Sacramento
| 
| LeVert (22)
| Allen (11)
| Allen (8)
| The ArenaNo in-person attendance
| 33–36
|- style="background:#bfb;"
| 70
| August 9
| @ L.A. Clippers
| 
| LeVert (27)
| Allen (16)
| LeVert (13)
| The ArenaNo in-person attendance
| 34–36
|- style="background:#bfb;"
| 71
| August 11
| @ Orlando
| 
| Luwawu-Cabarrot, Martin (24)
| Hall, Kurucs (9)
| Martin, Musa (6)
| The ArenaNo in-person attendance
| 35–36
|- style="background:#fbb;"
| 72
| August 13
| Portland
| 
| LeVert (37)
| Allen (11)
| LeVert (9)
| The ArenaNo in-person attendance
| 35–37

|- style="background:#;"
| 65
| March 12
| @ Golden State
| 
| 
| 
| 
| Chase Center
| 
|- style="background:#;"
| 66
| March 13
| @ L.A. Clippers
| 
| 
| 
| 
| Staples Center
| 
|- style="background:#;"
| 67
| March 15
| @ Sacramento
| 
| 
| 
| 
| Golden 1 Center
| 
|- style="background:#;"
| 68
| March 18
| Washington
| 
| 
| 
| 
| Barclays Center
| 
|- style="background:#;"
| 69
| March 21
| Boston
| 
| 
| 
| 
| Barclays Center
| 
|- style="background:#;"
| 70
| March 23
| Orlando
| 
| 
| 
| 
| Barclays Center
| 
|- style="background:#;"
| 71
| March 25
| L.A. Clippers
| 
| 
| 
| 
| Barclays Center
| 
|- style="background:#;"
| 72
| March 27
| @ Orlando
| 
| 
| 
| 
| Amway Center
| 
|- style="background:#;"
| 73
| March 28
| Cleveland
| 
| 
| 
| 
| Barclays Center
| 
|- style="background:#;"
| 74
| March 30
| Portland
| 
| 
| 
| 
| Barclays Center
| 
|- style="background:#;"
| 75
| April 1
| Detroit
| 
| 
| 
| 
| Barclays Center
| 
|- style="background:#;"
| 76
| April 3
| @ Indiana
| 
| 
| 
| 
| Bankers Life Fieldhouse
| 
|- style="background:#;"
| 77
| April 5
| Dallas
| 
| 
| 
| 
| Barclays Center
| 
|- style="background:#;"
| 78
| April 7
| @ Oklahoma City
| 
| 
| 
| 
| Chesapeake Energy Arena
| 
|- style="background:#;"
| 79
| April 9
| @ Milwaukee
| 
| 
| 
| 
| Fiserv Forum
| 
|- style="background:#;"
| 80
| April 11
| @ Chicago
| 
| 
| 
| 
| United Center
| 
|- style="background:#;"
| 81
| April 13
| @ Cleveland
| 
| 
| 
| 
| Rocket Mortgage FieldHouse
| 
|- style="background:#;"
| 82
| April 15
| Milwaukee
| 
| 
| 
| 
| Barclays Center
|

Playoffs

|- style="background:#fbb;"
| 1
| August 17
| @ Toronto
| 
| Luwawu-Cabarrot (26)
| Allen (12)
| LeVert (15)
| AdventHealth ArenaNo in-person attendance
| 0–1
|- style="background:#fbb;"
| 2
| August 19
| @ Toronto
| 
| Temple (21)
| Allen, Harris (15)
| LeVert (11)
| HP Field HouseNo in-person attendance
| 0–2
|- style="background:#fbb;"
| 3
| August 21
| Toronto
| 
| Johnson (23)
| Allen (17)
| LeVert (6)
| HP Field HouseNo in-person attendance
| 0–3
|- style="background:#fbb;"
| 4
| August 23
| Toronto
| 
| LeVert (35)
| Allen (15)
| Chiozza, LeVert (6)
| HP Field HouseNo in-person attendance
| 0–4

Player statistics

Regular season statistics
As of August 13, 2020

|-
| style="text-align:left;"| || 70 || 64 || 26.5 || .649 || .000 || .633 || 9.6 || 1.6 || .6 || 1.3 || 11.1
|-
| style="text-align:left;"| || 10 || 1 || 10.7 || .263 || .207 || .500 || 2.1 || .8 || .0 || .6 || 2.8
|-
| style="text-align:left;"| || 35 || 3 || 21.0 || .404 || .306 || .870 || 4.1 || 1.1 || .5 || .3 || 5.9
|-
| style="text-align:left;"| || 18 || 2 || 15.4 || .425 || .357 || 1.000 || 2.1 || 3.1 || .6 || .1 || 6.4
|-
| style="text-align:left;"| || 15 || 0 || 12.5 || .563 || .143 || .524 || 2.9 || 1.1 || .1 || .5 || 4.4
|-
| style="text-align:left;"| || 1 || 0 || 6.0 || .500 || .500 ||  || .0 || 3.0 || .0 || .0 || 5.0
|-
| style="text-align:left;"| || 64 || 49 || 31.2 || .415 || .308 || .778 || 3.5 || 6.8 || .6 || .3 || 20.6
|-
| style="text-align:left;"| || 5 || 0 || 3.0 || .143 || .000 ||  || 1.2 || .2 || .0 || .0 || .4
|-
| style="text-align:left;"| || 5 || 0 || 17.0 || .778 ||  || .417 || 4.6 || .4 || .4 || 1.0 || 6.6
|-
| style="text-align:left;"| || 69 || 69 || 30.8 || .486 || .424 || .719 || 4.3 || 2.1 || .6 || .2 || 14.5
|-
| style="text-align:left;"| || 20 || 20 || 32.9 || .478 || .394 || .922 || 5.2 || 6.4 || 1.4 || .5 || 27.4
|-
| style="text-align:left;"| || 8 || 4 || 24.3 || .405 || .389 || 1.000 || 3.0 || 3.0 || .5 || .1 || 12.0
|-
| style="text-align:left;"| || 56 || 6 || 22.0 || .666 ||  || .680 || 10.0 || 1.9 || .3 || .9 || 8.3
|-
| style="text-align:left;"| || 47 || 9 || 14.6 || .446 || .367 || .632 || 2.9 || 1.1 || .5 || .1 || 4.6
|-
| style="text-align:left;"| || 45 || 31 || 29.6 || .425 || .364 || .711 || 4.2 || 4.4 || 1.2 || .2 || 18.7
|-
| style="text-align:left;"| || 47 || 2 || 18.1 || .435 || .388 || .852 || 2.7 || .6 || .4 || .1 || 7.8
|-
| style="text-align:left;"| || 9 || 0 || 11.0 || .453 || .278 || .786 || 1.1 || 2.0 || .8 || .2 || 7.1
|-
| style="text-align:left;"| || 40 || 0 || 12.2 || .372 || .244 || .750 || 2.2 || 1.1 || .4 || .0 || 4.8
|-
| style="text-align:left;"| || 20 || 0 || 13.4 || .521 || .429 || .667 || 2.3 || .4 || .6 || .6 || 5.2
|-
| style="text-align:left;"| || 33 || 0 || 11.1 || .290 || .188 || .938 || 1.6 || 1.7 || .5 || .1 || 3.6
|-
| style="text-align:left;"| || 64 || 61 || 29.0 || .376 || .339 || .798 || 6.0 || 1.8 || .9 || .4 || 12.1
|-
| style="text-align:left;"| || 13 || 0 || 18.5 || .328 || .242 || .571 || 2.6 || .9 || .9 || .2 || 4.2
|-
| style="text-align:left;"| || 62 || 35 || 27.9 || .378 || .329 || .805 || 3.5 || 2.5 || .8 || .5 || 10.3
|-
| style="text-align:left;"| || 7 || 4 || 14.0 || .308 || .400 || 1.000 || 1.9 || .9 || .0 || .0 || 3.4

Playoff statistics
As of August 23, 2020

|-
| style="text-align:left;"| || 4 || 4 || 33.0 || .583 ||  || .813 || 14.8 || 2.3 || .5 || 1.8 || 10.3
|-
| style="text-align:left;"| || 3 || 0 || 9.3 || .417 || .455 || 1.000 || 2.7 || 1.0 || .0 || .3 || 6.3
|-
| style="text-align:left;"| || 4 || 0 || 16.3 || .333 || .313 || .500 || 1.5 || 4.3 || 1.3 || .0 || 5.8
|-
| style="text-align:left;"| || 3 || 0 || 6.7 || .600 ||  || .250 || 1.7 || .0 || .0 || .7 || 2.3
|-
| style="text-align:left;"| || 2 || 2 || 36.0 || .522 || .583 || .500 || 10.0 || 1.0 || .5 || .0 || 16.5
|-
| style="text-align:left;"| || 4 || 2 || 23.3 || .457 || .393 || 1.000 || 1.8 || 2.3 || .0 || .3 || 13.8
|-
| style="text-align:left;"| || 4 || 1 || 14.5 || .550 || .000 || .000 || 3.3 || .8 || .3 || .5 || 5.5
|-
| style="text-align:left;"| || 4 || 4 || 35.0 || .370 || .429 || .720 || 6.0 || 9.5 || 1.3 || .3 || 20.3
|-
| style="text-align:left;"| || 4 || 3 || 32.8 || .339 || .333 || .917 || 3.8 || 1.5 || .8 || .0 || 16.0
|-
| style="text-align:left;"| || 3 || 0 || 9.0 || .286 || .600 || 1.000 || 1.0 || 1.3 || .0 || .3 || 4.0
|-
| style="text-align:left;"| || 3 || 0 || 13.0 || .182 || .000 || .714 || 1.0 || 1.3 || .0 || .3 || 4.7
|-
| style="text-align:left;"| || 4 || 4 || 34.3 || .347 || .250 || .833 || 2.8 || 2.0 || .8 || .3 || 12.0
|-
| style="text-align:left;"| || 3 || 0 || 5.7 || .200 || .000 || .500 || 1.0 || .0 || .0 || .3 || 1.3

Transactions

Trades

Additions

Subtractions

References

External links
 2019–20 Brooklyn Nets at Basketball-Reference.com

Brooklyn Nets season
Brooklyn Nets seasons
Brooklyn Nets
Brooklyn Nets
21st century in Brooklyn
Events in Brooklyn, New York
Prospect Heights, Brooklyn